Serhiy Volodymyrovych Myakushko (born 15 April 1993) is a Ukrainian professional footballer who plays as a midfielder for Kolos Kovalivka.

Career
Myakushko is a product of various Kyiv city youth football clubs including the Obolon Kyiv  and Dynamo Kyiv academies.

He made his debut for FC Obolon entering as a substituted player in a game against Dynamo Kyiv on 22 July 2011 in the Ukrainian Premier League.

In February 2013 he signed a contract with Dynamo Kyiv in the Ukrainian Premier League.

In 2017–2019 Myakushko played for the Carpathian region club Karpaty. In May 2019 he was recognized as a player of the month in the Ukrainian Premier League.

In July 2019 he signed a contract with the Segunda División club AD Alcorcon.

International career
In 2011-2014 Myakushko played for Ukraine at under-19 level and under-21.

Honours

Club
Dynamo Kyiv
Ukrainian Premier League: 2015–16
Ukrainian Super Cup: 2016

References

External links
 
 
 

1993 births
Living people
Footballers from Kyiv
Association football midfielders
Ukrainian footballers
Ukraine youth international footballers
Ukraine under-21 international footballers
Ukraine international footballers
FC Obolon-Brovar Kyiv players
FC Obolon-2 Kyiv players
FC Hoverla Uzhhorod players
FC Dynamo Kyiv players
FC Dynamo-2 Kyiv players
FC Vorskla Poltava players
FC Karpaty Lviv players
Podbeskidzie Bielsko-Biała players
AD Alcorcón footballers
FC Mynai players
FC Kolos Kovalivka players
Ukrainian Premier League players
Ukrainian First League players
Ukrainian Second League players
Segunda División players
Ekstraklasa players
Ukrainian expatriate footballers
Ukrainian expatriate sportspeople in Spain
Expatriate footballers in Spain
Ukrainian expatriate sportspeople in Poland
Expatriate footballers in Poland